DC Health Link is the health insurance marketplace for the District of Columbia, created pursuant to the Patient Protection and Affordable Care Act.  DC Health Link is administered by the District's Health Benefit Exchange Authority.

As of January 10, 2014, DC Health Link had enrolled 3,646 people in individual or family insurance plans. The District has had more success than the states' health insurance exchanges in signing up young people. Many members of Congress are enrolled in DC Health Link.

On March 8, 2023, Congress was warned of a breach of DC Health Link data on the Dark Web. The culprits claim to have the information of 170,000 DC Health Link customers.

References

External links

 
 Health Insurance & Medicare Supplements
 DC Health Benefit Exchange Authority Website

District of Columbia
Healthcare in Washington, D.C.
District of Columbia
Government of the District of Columbia
2012 establishments in Washington, D.C.